The Petite rivière Saint-François (English: Little Saint-François River) is a tributary of the northwest shore of the St. Lawrence River. This river flows in the municipality of Petite-Rivière-Saint-François, in the Charlevoix Regional County Municipality, in the administrative region of Capitale-Nationale, in the province of Quebec, in Canada.

The lower part is served by rue Principale de Petite-Rivière-Saint-François, which runs along the Saint-Laurent river. The economic activities of this valley are concentrated on the bank of the river where recreational tourism activities (notably vacationing) are developed. In addition, the peaks and flanks of the surrounding mountains are used for recreational tourism activities, in particular the important alpine ski center of Massif de Charlevoix which is located very close to the south side of this river and whose flank the mountain for alpine skiing faces the river.

The surface of the lower part of the Petite Rivière Saint-François is generally frozen from the beginning of December until the end of March, except the backwater zones; however, safe traffic on the ice is generally from mid-December to mid-March. The upper part has an additional week's freezing period. The water level of the river varies with the seasons and the precipitation; the spring flood occurs in March or April.

Geography 
The Petite Rivière Saint-François rises at the confluence of two mountain streams, in the municipality of Petite-Rivière-Saint-François, on the north side of the mountain peak at Liguori. This source is located at:
  south of downtown Baie-Saint-Paul;
  west of the center of the village of Petite-Rivière-Saint-François;
  east of route 138 which is 5 to 6 kilometers away at this point on the St. Lawrence River;
  north-east of Saint-Tite-des-Caps town center.

The Petite Rivière Saint-François flows onto the northwest shore of the St. Lawrence River, in the municipality of Petite-Rivière-Saint-François. This confluence is located at:

  south of the center of the village of Petite-Rivière-Saint-François;
  east of  route 138;
  north of the hamlet of Grande-Pointe.

Toponymy 
During his exploratory journey of 1603 on the St. Lawrence River, Champlain designated this river in the form of "Little River". This watercourse was later designated under the following variants: “Bergeron river” and “Rivière du Sot”.

The toponym "Petite rivière Saint-François" was formalized on December 5, 1968 at the Place Names Bank of the Commission de toponymie du Québec.

References

See also 

 Charlevoix Regional County Municipality
 Petite-Rivière-Saint-François, a municipality
 Le Massif, a massif in Charlevoix
 St. Lawrence River
 List of rivers of Quebec

Rivers of Capitale-Nationale
Charlevoix Regional County Municipality